Aghcheh Kandi (also Romanized as Āghcheh Kandī; also known as Agchen Kandi, Āghjeh Kandī, and Akhcha Kand) is a village in Qaranqu Rural District, in the Central District of Hashtrud County, East Azerbaijan Province, Iran. At the 2006 census, its population was 267, in 61 families.

References 

Towns and villages in Hashtrud County